Many hotels converted from large private residences have gardens designed by famous garden designers or are particularly notable for their gardens.  Alternative uses have had to be found for castles, palaces, monasteries, mansions and country seats which have become financially unviable as homes, and their conversion into hotels has often been successful. This has led to the creation of 'garden hotels', many of which are better known for their gardens than for their modern use as hotels. Examples include:
Austria: Hotel im Palais Schwarzenberg
England:
Gravetye Manor, the former home of William Robinson
Cliveden, designed by Charles Barry with a rose garden by Geoffrey Jellicoe
Germany: Anholt Wasserburg Garten
India: Udaipur Lake Palace, Udaipur, Rajasthan
Italy:
Villa Cipressi
Villa d'Este, Lake Como
Villa Serbelloni Garden
Iran: Abbasi Hotel
Portugal: Bussaco Palace
Spain:
Monasterio de Piedra Garden
Hostal de los Reyes Catolicos
United States:
Mohonk Mountain House Gardens
Grand Hotel Garden
Guatemala:
Hotel Quinta De Las Flores

See also
Hotels

Hotel types
Gardens